Alma College is a private Presbyterian liberal arts college in Alma, Michigan. It enrolls approximately 1,400 students and is accredited by the Higher Learning Commission.

Alma College is affiliated with the Presbyterian Church (USA) and offers bachelor's degrees in multiple disciplines as well as the Master of Fine Arts (MFA) in Creative Writing and the Master of Science in Communication and Information Technology. Its athletics teams, nicknamed the Scots, are part of the National Collegiate Athletic Association (NCAA) - Division III and the Michigan Intercollegiate Athletic Association (MIAA).

History
The college was founded by Michigan Presbyterians in 1886. It received funding from lumber magnate Ammi W. Wright, for whom Wright Hall on campus and Wright Avenue in the city of Alma are named.

A marker designating the college as a Michigan Historic Site was erected by the Michigan History Division, Department of State. The inscription reads:

On October 26, 1886, the Presbyterian Synod of Michigan accepted an offer by Ammi W. Wright of Alma of thirty acres of land, containing two buildings, and a gift of $50,000 from Alexander Folsom of Bay City, for the purpose of establishing Alma College. The Synod had resolved: "We will, with God's help, establish and endow a college within our bounds." A charter was granted by the state of Michigan, April 15, 1887. Classes began September 12, 1887. In the first year there were 95 students and nine faculty members. Here the Presbyterian Church has fostered the pursuit of learning to the glory of God and to the dignity of men.

Additional markers designate the site of the college's Old Main and Folsom Hall as Michigan Historic Sites. The Folsom Hall inscription reads:

 When completed in 1895, this building was Alma College's first gymnasium. The physical education facilities were on the second floor and below them were a museum, locker room and classroom which at one time served the College's Kindergarten Training Department. In the early 1920s, after completion of Memorial Gymnasium, the structure was altered and became the Chemistry Building. After Dow Science Building was erected in 1959, the structure contained offices and classrooms for several departments and was renamed the Arts Building. It was named Folsom Hall in 1964 to honor Mr. Alexander Folsom of Bay city, one of the first benefactors of the College.

The Old Main inscription reads:

 Originally known as the Administration Building, Old Main and an adjacent structure, Pioneer Hall, were actually older than Alma College. Completed early in 1886, the buildings were to constitute the Central Michigan Normal School and Business College. However, that venture failed and in autumn of the same year they were given by Mr. Ammi W. Wright to the Synod of Michigan of the United Presbyterian Church so that it might establish Alma College. For the first 83 years of the College's history, Old Main was the principal classroom building. It was destroyed by fire on March 10, 1969.

Prior to 1934, the Alma mascot was the Fighting Presbyterians. This became the subject of debate in 1931 due to a series of stories by The Almanian, a student-run newspaper, expressing discontent over the limitation on cheers to "Go Presbyterians" or "Go Campbellites," the latter in support of the football coach, Royal Campbell.

The college's 13th president, Dr. Jeff Abernathy, assumed leadership in June 2010.

Scottish heritage

In 1931, a contest was held to come up with a new nickname, and "the Scots" — a nod to the Presbyterian Church's roots in Scotland — was chosen. Since that time, Alma College has embraced its Scottish traditions. Today, this is evident through many programs and symbols, including the Alma College Pipe Band, Kiltie Dancers, and its tartan.

While still maintaining a close relationship with the Presbyterian Church, Alma College accepts and welcomes students of all religious backgrounds.

Academics

Alma College offers more than 45 undergraduate academic programs, and two graduate programs, leading to Bachelor of Arts, Bachelor of Science, Bachelor of Science in Nursing, Bachelor of Music, Master of Fine Arts in Creative Writing and Master of Science in Communication Information Technology degrees. In addition to the academic majors, numerous concentrations, academic institutes, and special programs are offered, including the Presidential Honors Program and the Center for College and Community Engagement. Its most popular majors, in terms of 2021 graduates, were:
Health & Wellness (33)
Psychology (26)
Biology/Biological Sciences (23)
Business Administration & Management (20)
Chemistry (17)
Elementary Education & Teaching (15)
Registered Nursing/Registered Nurse (15)

Along with its on-campus options, Alma College offers a number of domestic off-campus and internship programs, in cities including Chicago, New York City, Philadelphia and Washington DC. Alma offers international study programs in countries including Argentina, Australia, Ecuador, England, France, Germany, Ghana, Greece, Ireland, Italy, New Zealand, Peru, Scotland and Spain.

Alma has a 4-4-1 academic calendar, with 14-week terms in the fall and winter, and a four-week term in May. Students typically use the latter term, known on-campus as Spring Term, for travel, classes, research and internships.

Model United Nations

Alma College's nationally recognized Model United Nations program has won top honors at the National Model United Nations conference in New York City for 23 consecutive years (1997–2019), the longest active winning streak of any college or university in the nation — a streak that was interrupted only due to the COVID-19 pandemic. Alma College's all-time 49 "outstanding delegation" awards are the most of any college or university in the 96-year history of the conference. The Huffington Post has called Alma College's MUN team a "superpower".

Graduate degrees

Alma College in 2021 launched the first graduate program in its then-134-year history with the Master of Fine Arts in Creative Writing degree, led by author and educator Sophfronia Scott.

In 2022, the college launched a Master of Science in Communication and Information Technology degree, led by Jared Linder, formerly the chief information officer for the State of Indiana's Family and Social Services Administration.

Campus

Alma College is located in a small-town setting, the city of Alma having slightly fewer than 10,000 residents. Its primary academic buildings, built with a red brick motif, are centered around a large square, McIntyre Mall. West of this mall is picturesque Dunning Memorial Chapel.

The majority of buildings are located on North Campus, that is, the area north of Superior Street. These include the major dormitory residences, as well as the academic and student life buildings. South Campus is home to suite-style residences ("New Dorms," so named because they were built later in the 1960s than residences in North Campus) as well as the new environmentally friendly apartment-style Wright Hall, inaugurated in 2005 and the second residence of its name, the former being demolished in 1976. South Campus is also home to "Fraternity Row" (Center Street) and "Sorority Row" (Superior Street) as well as several other themed houses. More than half of the buildings on Alma's campus were built under the long tenure (1956–80) of Robert D. Swanson, after whom the main academic building is named.

The Dow Science Center, renovated in 2018, features the Rollin M. Gerstacker Science and Technology Suite, as well as the Dow Digital Science Center (DDSC). These spaces offer academic student study space, large screen monitors for showing remote projects in real time, dedicated computer work stations, a large conference room designed for distance room and a seminar room. The DDSC sponsors summer camps for elementary, middle and high school students in the area.

The college in 2019 dedicated the Wright Leppien Opera House Block, a historic structure in downtown Alma which had been gutted by a fire almost a decade earlier. "The Opera House," as it is locally known, was historically considered to be the main local venue for numerous theatrical productions, concerts and public lectures. Today, it is used for student housing and special events.

The college in 2022 began a $14-million renovation  of its library building into a new facility, called the Learning Commons, which will serve as both a library and a student union.

Athletics
Generally, more than half (52.4%) of Alma's students participate in sports. In December 2021, the college announced the addition of women's wrestling  bringing the total number of sports offered up to 12 men's NCAA and 12 women's NCAA, plus co-ed esports and women's bowling, competitive cheer, dance, and STUNT.

The mascot of Alma College is Scotty. He wears a traditional highland Kilt, sporran, and sash woven in the Alma College tartan pattern.

Honors
 In 2006, Alma College quarterback Josh Brehm was named the recipient of the Gagliardi Trophy, the highest individual honor in NCAA Division III football.
 In 1992, Alma's women's basketball team earned the NCAA Division III championship.
 In 1999, Alma's men's soccer team made it to the NCAA Final Four.
 In 2016, Alma's men's basketball team made it to the NCAA Round of Eight, the first appearance in the NCAA tournament in the program's history.
In 2022, Alma's competitive cheer team won a second-consecutive National Cheerleaders Association (NCA) Division 3 championship.
In 2022, Alma's dance team won its third-consecutive National Dance Alliance (NDA) Division 3 championship.

Performing arts
More than a third of all Alma students take part in at least one performance each year. The college offers majors in theatre, dance and music, but students of all majors may join in productions. The Heritage Center for the Performing Arts is the region's premiere performing arts facility. It houses the Theatre and Dance Department, and serves as the performance venue for the college's eight music ensembles. It features a 500-seat concert hall for large performances, an intimate 190-seat theatre, and a dance studio.

Greek life
Several social Greek letter organizations are active on the Alma College campus.  There are five social fraternities: Zeta Sigma, Delta Gamma Tau, Phi Mu Alpha Sinfonia, Sigma Chi, and Tau Kappa Epsilon. There are five social sororities: Kappa Iota, Alpha Gamma Delta, Alpha Xi Delta, Gamma Phi Beta, and Phi Sigma Sigma.  Other Greek organizations on campus include Sigma Alpha Iota, a women's music fraternity,  and Alpha Phi Omega, a co-ed National Service Fraternity, in addition to numerous honorary and professional fraternities.

Notable alumni

 George Allen (1918-1990), NFL coach inducted in Pro Football Hall of Fame
 Jake Boss (born 1971),  NCAA Baseball player and coach, head coach at Michigan State University
 Bob Bruce (1933–2017), Major League Baseball pitcher from 1959 to 1967
 Paul Hale Bruske (1877–1956), writer, journalist, advertising executive, and sportsman
 William Skinner Cooper (1884–1978), botanist and ecologist; former president of the Ecological Society of America and the Minnesota Academy of Science
 Jim Daniels (born 1956), poet and writer
 Bob Devaney (1915–1997), NCAA football player and Nebraska coach inducted in College Football Hall of Fame
 Paul Ganus, (born, 1961), actor
 Brad Guigar (born 1969), cartoonist
 Jennifer Haase (born 1974), teacher and politician, served in Michigan State House of Representatives
 Frank Knox (1874–1944), newspaper editor and publisher; served as Secretary of the Navy and was a onetime Republican Party vice-presidential candidate
 Betty Mahmoody (born 1945), writer and activist, author of Not Without My Daughter (1987), adapted as 1991 film of the same name
 Jim Northrup (1939–2011), MLB player, Detroit Tigers
 Gary Peters (born 1958), Politician, currently member United States Senate (D-MI)
 Dan Scripps, Former politician and President of the Michigan Energy Innovation Business Council
 Lester W. Sharp (1887–1961), Botanist and pioneer in cytogenetics
 Tom Shaw (1945–2014, SSJE), priest and Fifteenth Episcopal Bishop of Massachusetts
 Denny Stolz (born 1934), NCAA football player and coach 
 Claude Watson (1885–1978), lawyer, businessman, and minister; temperance movement leader and two-time Prohibition Party presidential candidate

References

External links

 Official website
 Official athletics website

 
1886 establishments in Michigan
Buildings and structures in Gratiot County, Michigan
Education in Gratiot County, Michigan
Educational institutions established in 1886
Liberal arts colleges in Michigan
Presbyterianism in Michigan
Tourist attractions in Gratiot County, Michigan
Universities and colleges affiliated with the Presbyterian Church (USA)
Private universities and colleges in Michigan
Universities and colleges accredited by the Higher Learning Commission